Jasenná is the name of several locations in the Czech Republic:

 Jasenná (Náchod District), a village in the Hradec Králové Region
 Jasenná (Zlín District), a village in the Zlín Region